Beltenebros, also known as Prince of Shadows, is a 1991 Spanish crime-thriller mystery film co-written and directed by Pilar Miró and starring Terence Stamp, Patsy Kensit, José Luis Gómez, Geraldine James and Simón Andreu. It was entered into the 42nd Berlin International Film Festival where it won the Silver Bear for outstanding artistic contribution.

Cast
 Terence Stamp as Darman
 Patsy Kensit as Rebeca
 José Luis Gómez as Ugarte / Valdivia
 Geraldine James as Rebeca Osorio
 Simón Andreu as Andrade
 Aleksander Bardini as Bernal (as Aleksander Bardin)
 John McEnery as Walter
 Jorge de Juan as Luque
 Pedro Díez del Corral as Policeman
 Carlos Hipólito as Boite Owner
 Francisco Casares as Train Steward
 Queta Claver as Dancer Boite
 Felipe Vélez as Policeman
 William Job as Howard
 Magdalena Wójcik as Polish Tango Dancer

References

External links

1991 films
1991 crime thriller films
Spanish crime thriller films
1990s Spanish-language films
Films directed by Pilar Miró
Silver Bear for outstanding artistic contribution
1990s Spanish films